Penicillium purpureum is a species of fungus in the genus Penicillium.

References

purpureum
Fungi described in 1972